Kurnell is a suburb in Sydney, in the state of New South Wales, Australia. Cronulla and Woolooware are the only adjacent suburbs. La Perouse is located opposite, on the northern headland of Botany Bay. The Cronulla sand dunes are on the south eastern headland of Botany Bay. The eastern side of the peninsula is part of Botany Bay National Park, and Towra Point Nature Reserve is located on the western side of the suburb.

History
Kurnell is the place where Captain James Cook landed on 29 April 1770, making first contact with the original inhabitants of the area, the Gweagal people whilst navigating his way up the East Coast of Australia on Endeavour. Captain Cook along with his crew stayed at Kurnell for a period of eight days. During their visit they collected botanical specimens, mapped the area and tried to make contact (unsuccessfully) with the indigenous population. When Cook reported back to England he said that the land was suitable for agriculture and was lightly wooded.

Captain Arthur Phillip, arriving in H.M. Armed Tender Supply on 18 January 1788, before the First Fleet arrived, following Cook's advice. They began to clear land and dig wells, near modern-day La Perouse but a week later, Phillip decided to abandon the site and moved north to Sydney Cove at Port Jackson.

Cook's landing place is located on the north-eastern part of the national park, just near Silver Beach. Sutherland Point is named in honour of a crew member, Scotsman Forby Sutherland, who died of tuberculosis during their eight days here and was buried on the shore. Cape Solander is named after Swedish botanist Daniel Solander, a colleague of Joseph Banks. Inscription Point was named by the Australian Philosophical Society in 1822 when they secured a plaque to the cliff face to mark the point of the Endeavour's crew first landing.

Dampier Street, Tasman Street and Torres Street commemorate other navigators in Australia's history.

'Alpha' is the first letter in the Greek alphabet and the name was thought appropriate for the first farm in the area. In 1821 John Connell Junior was also granted land here and used it for timber getting. His father purchased Alpha Farm from Birnie and by 1842 the Connell family's estate was over one thousand acres (4 km²) in size. In 1860, Alpha Farm was sold to Thomas Holt (1811–88), who owned most of the land that stretched from Sutherland to Cronulla. The area was known as Birniemere for a time and Holtmere was once a locality.

Before the 1920s, Kurnell was used by fishermen as schools of several varieties of fish inhabited the Botany Bay foreshore and the open sea. Fishermen built numerous huts and shacks which sheltered them for the weekend fishing. During the Great Depression, from the late 1920s, many severely affected low-income families took up residence there, in a shantytown.

2015 storm 
On 16 December 2015 a supercell tracked along New South Wales coast producing a strong F2 tornado, high rainfall, hailstones and unusually strong winds. Kurnell was particularly hard hit at about 10:30 am with homes and businesses un-roofed, sewerage and electricity cut, two trucks tipped on their sides, and workers evacuated from Kurnell Refinery and the desalination plant, which was damaged. A "Wind gust of 213 km/h recorded in Kurnell at 10:33am," was "the fastest wind speed recorded in NSW history". Injuries to people were only minor. The damage to Kurnell was calculated to have cost insurers . Elsewhere on the same day roof damage occurred at Westfield Bondi Junction and in South Nowra.  Thousands of homes lost power in Bulli, Thirroul and Woonona north of Wollongong.

Name

It is possibly a corruption of a Dharug term "cunthal", "kundle" or "koondool", perhaps meaning "place of or where the wild carrot grows". Alternatively it is an Aboriginal corruption of the surname of John Connell, who was granted land in the area in 1821.

Heritage listings 
Kurnell has a number of heritage-listed sites, including:
 Cape Solander Drive: Kamay Botany Bay National Park

Population
In the 2016 Census, there were 2,267 people in Kurnell. 83.1% of people were born in Australia and 90.6% of people only spoke English at home. The most common responses for religion were No Religion 27.5%, Anglican 27.3% and Catholic 26.9%.

Places of interest

The northern part of the peninsula is a historic site known as Captain Cooks Landing Place with a number of memorials located here:
 Captain Cook Memorial Obelisk
 Kamay Botany Bay Discovery Centre
 Sir Joseph Banks Memorial
 Solander Monument
 Sutherland Monument
 Marton Park (Home of the mighty Kurnell Stingrays) on Game Day

The Discovery Centre provides information and displays relics from the early days in Kurnell's history. Endeavour Heights is a recreation area in the Botany Bay National Park. The Kurnell Lookout provides brilliant views of Botany Bay and the northern headland of Botany Bay at La Perouse. Cape Solander is popular amongst whale watchers during the migration season.

Commercial areas

The small residential area with a population of 2,260 is located to the north with a small group of shops in the village of Kurnell. Sand mining on the peninsula has depleted the area of much of the sand that was originally there. It has been said that 40-metre deep pools now form in the dunes and are clearly visible in view from Google Earth. The remaining sand dune is used as a recreational off-road area for 4 wheel drives. The Cronulla sand dunes formed part of the location for the films Forty Thousand Horsemen, directed by Charles Chauvel in 1940 and Mad Max Beyond Thunderdome.

Kurnell is dominated by an industrial area, which once included the Caltex Oil Refinery which is now closed. It now functions as an bulk fuels import terminal to supply imported fuel for Australian customers. Refined petrol is piped to the other side of Botany Bay in an underwater pipeline. The Kurnell Desalination Plant, opened in 2010, now provides much of the rest of Sydney with an alternative water supply. It has been criticised on environmental grounds (greenhouse gases and impact of large amounts of deoxygenated brine), and was shelved, but was resumed after the March 2007 NSW state elections. Continued widespread protest by residential, environmental, and community groups was declared to be irrelevant. Immediate work began on a pipeline under Botany Bay to carry desalinated water to northern suburbs and the size of the desalination plant was doubled. The water supply of Kurnell is supplemented with bore water. Total water stored in the Sydney catchment was at a low of 36.9% on 7 June 2007 but rainfall increased volume stored to 64% as of 7 February 2008, before reaching over 98% capacity in March 2012.

Transport

Transdev NSW operates bus route 987 Kurnell to Cronulla via North Cronulla.

Sport and recreation
Kurnell is home to the Stingrays JRLFC, one of the Shire's rugby league clubs. Green hills Skatepark is located in Kurnell on Captain Cook Drive. It consists of a small and large bowl and street sections. 
Triathlons are held in Kurnell annually. There are running tracks through Botany Bay National Park, as well as running along the beach and swimming in the netted area of Silver Beach. This location also offers fishing, sailing, scuba diving and windsurfing activities. There is a free shuttle bus service during whale watching season, departing from the parking area of the office of the National Park. Boat Harbour Beach is the location of a 4WD park. Access can be gained via Captain Cook Drive. People are permitted to drive on the beach with their 4WDs. An entry fee is required and one may drive along the beach for at least two kilometres.

Gallery

References

 
Suburbs of Sydney
Kurnell Peninsula
Botany Bay
Sutherland Shire